Kimbe Cutters is a semi-professional rugby league club from West New Britain province of Papua New Guinea that will be participating in its fourth season in the 2022 Papua New Guinea National Rugby League Competition.

2022 squad

References 

Papua New Guinean rugby league teams